The Medvedev–Sponheuer–Karnik scale, also known as the MSK or MSK-64, is a macroseismic intensity scale used to evaluate the severity of ground shaking on the basis of observed effects in an area where an earthquake transpires.

The scale was first proposed by Sergei Medvedev (USSR), Wilhelm Sponheuer (East Germany), and Vít Kárník (Czechoslovakia) in 1964.  It was based on the experiences being available in the early 1960s from the application of the Modified Mercalli intensity scale and the 1953 version of the Medvedev scale, known also as the GEOFIAN scale.

With minor modifications in the mid-1970s and early 1980s, the MSK scale became widely used in Europe and the USSR. In early 1990s, the European Seismological Commission (ESC) used many of the principles formulated in the MSK in the development of the European Macroseismic Scale, which is now a de facto standard for evaluation of seismic intensity in European countries. MSK-64 is still being used in India, Israel, Russia, and throughout the Commonwealth of Independent States.

Medvedev–Sponheuer–Karnik scale
The Medvedev–Sponheuer–Karnik scale is somewhat similar to the Modified Mercalli (MM) scale used in the United States. The MSK scale has 12 intensity degrees expressed in Roman numerals (to prevent the use of decimals):

References

External links 
 MSK-64-based seismic intensity maps of Russia

Seismic intensity scales
Science and technology in the Soviet Union